Infinity Plus (sometimes stylized as infinity plus and infinityplus) was a science fiction webzine active from 1997 to 2007, specializing in reviews, interviews, and professionally written fiction. It was founded by Keith Brooke (who took a "deliberately elitist approach"); Nick Gevers and Paul Barnett were associate editors. As of 2018, it continues to exist as a small press.

Brian Stableford declared it to be the "leading sf site in the United Kingdom", and SF Signal called it "informative and insightful".

References

External links
Official site

Internet properties established in 1997
Internet properties disestablished in 2007
Science fiction webzines
Horror fiction websites